"Gimme All Your Love" is a song performed by American rock band Alabama Shakes, issued as the second single from the band's second studio album Sound & Color. Co-produced by the band and written by lead singer Brittany Howard, the song peaked at #36 on the Billboard rock chart. The band performed the song live on television for the first time on February 28, 2015 on Saturday Night Live.

Critical reception
FDRMX magazine described the song as "sheer musical bliss deriving from the innermost corners of the soul".

In 2016, song's engineer Shawn Everett, won the Canadian Juno Awards for Recording Engineer of the Year for it.

Music video
At the time of the album release, no official music video was created for the song. However, a video featuring the song's audio became available in February 2015. On April 5, 2016 Alabama Shakes choose the video submitted by Marie Laure Blancho and Larry Ismail out of the 101 videos submitted from 26 countries as the official video.

Chart positions

References

External links
 

2015 songs
2015 singles
Alabama Shakes songs
ATO Records singles
MapleMusic Recordings singles
Rough Trade Records singles
Song recordings produced by Brittany Howard
Song recordings produced by Blake Mills
Songs written by Brittany Howard